Ashurst railway station is on the  branch of the Oxted line in southern England and serves Ashurst in Kent (very close to the East Sussex border). The station is managed by Southern.

History

Opened by the London, Brighton and South Coast Railway, it became part of the Southern Railway during the grouping of 1923. The station then passed on to the Southern Region of British Railways on nationalisation in 1948.
The station was destaffed around 1970 following which all the station buildings were demolished in 1983.

When sectorisation was introduced in the 1980s, the station was served by Network SouthEast until the privatisation of British Railways.

Facilities
Ashurst station is unstaffed and tickets must be bought from the self-service ticket machine at the station. 

The station has passenger help points and covered seating areas available on both platforms. The station also has a small car park and cycle rack at the station entrance.

The Uckfield bound platform is accessible without steps however the London bound platform is only reachable by the stepped footbridge so isn't accessible.

Services
All services at Ashurst are operated by Southern using  DMUs.

The typical off-peak service in trains per hour is:
 1 tph to  via 
 1 tph to 
 
Services increase to 2 tph in each direction during the peak hours.
 
On Sundays, the northbound service runs as far as Oxted only.

References

External links 

Railway stations in Royal Tunbridge Wells
Former London, Brighton and South Coast Railway stations
Railway stations in Great Britain opened in 1888
Railway stations served by Govia Thameslink Railway